Odetta Sings the Blues is an album by American folk singer Odetta, released in 1968. It is a reissue  of the 1962 Riverside release Odetta and the Blues.

Track listing

Side one
"Hard, Oh Lord" (4:05)
"Believe I'll Go" (3:03)
"Oh, Papa" (3:16)
"How Long Blues" (2:06)
"Hogan's Alley" (2:09)
"Leavin' This Mornin'" (2:46)

Side two
"Oh My Babe"  (4:19)
"Yonder Come the Blues"  (2:48)
"Make Me a Pallet on Your Floor" (3:47)
"Weeping Willow Blues"  (2:35)
"Go Down Sunshine"  (2:17)
"Nobody Knows You When You're Down and Out" (2:19)

Personnel
Odetta – vocals, guitar
Buck Clayton - trumpet
Vic Dickenson - trombone
Herb Hall - clarinet
Dick Wellstood - piano
Ahmed Abdul-Malik - bass
"Shep" Shephard - drums

References

1968 albums
Odetta albums
Riverside Records albums
Albums produced by Orrin Keepnews